Charles Perry is an American politician and accountant serving as a member of the Texas Senate from the 28th district. He assumed office on September 30, 2014. He was previously a member of the Texas House of Representatives for the 83rd district from 2010 to 2014.

Early life and education 
Perry is a native of Lubbock, Texas. After graduating from Sweetwater High School in Sweetwater, Texas, Perry earned a Bachelor of Business Administration degree in accounting and management information systems from Texas Tech University.

Career 
Outside of politics, Perry works as a Certified Public Accountant. He served as a member of the Texas House of Representatives for the 83rd district from 2010 to 2014. During his tenure in the House, Perry served as vice chair of the Government Efficiency & Reform Committee and chair of the Agriculture, Water and Rural Affairs Committee. Perry was elected to the Texas Senate in 2014. Since 2019, Perry has serviced as chair of the Senate Water and Rural Affairs Committee and as vice chair of the Senate Health & Human Services Committee. He has also served as a member of the Western States Water Council and Southwestern States Water Commission.

References 

1962 births
Living people
People from Lubbock, Texas
People from Sweetwater, Texas
American accountants
Republican Party members of the Texas House of Representatives
Republican Party Texas state senators
Texas Tech University alumni
21st-century American politicians